Hynhamia runtuana is a species of moth of the family Tortricidae. It is found in Ecuador.

The ground colour of the forewings is pale yellowish cream, in the costal area slightly mixed with brownish. The hindwings are cream, dotted pale brownish terminally.

Etymology
The specific name refers to the type locality.

References

External links

Moths described in 2009
Endemic fauna of Ecuador
runtuana
Moths of South America
Taxa named by Józef Razowski